Bilikere is a small town in Hunsur taluk of Mysore district in the Indian state of Karnataka.

Location
Nearby villages include:
 Yalachavadi - 2 km
 Manuganahalli - 4 km
 Bolanahalli - 5 km
 Gagenahalli - 6 km
 Devarahalli - 4 km
 Doddamaragowdanahalli - 8 km
 Nagawala - 9 km
 Husenapura-6 km

Etymology
Bilikere got its name from a 100-acre water tank that had a white colour.

Education
The nearest college is the Government Pre-University College Hanasoge. Schools include Adulam High school, Sri Manjunatha High school and the Morarji Desai School.

Notable people
 Bilikere Srinivasa Rao Dwarakanath (born 1955), molecular biologist. 
Devaraj Wodeyar Hosahally (born on November 6, 1984, from Wodeyar Hosahally, Bilikere) is a psychologist and a research scholar from Jawaharlal Nehru University, New Delhi.

Image gallery

References

Villages in Mysore district